The Yanxi class weapon trials ship is a class of little known naval auxiliary ship of the People's Liberation Army Navy (PLAN).  The name of this class is after the first unit commissioned, with the exact type still remains unknown. Contrary to the usual naming conventions of Chinese military where the ship is designated by a combination of two Chinese characters followed by three-digit number, the Yanxi class is designated by only a single Chinese character, which is Xun (训), short for Xun-Lian (训练), meaning training in Chinese, because these ships of this class is also used as training ships, but only a single unit of this class has been built. However, the pennant numbers may have changed due to the change of Chinese naval ships naming convention.

The Yanxi class carried no systems other than anti-aircraft guns and radars, but it did support Soviet Styx surface-to-surface missile (SSM) launch and recovery during tests. In addition to weapon trials ship, the Yanxi class is also used as a training ship, and it can carry thirty instructors with two hundred cadets when used in that role.  With more advanced and larger weapon trials ships and training ships entering Chinese service to replace its original weapon trials and training role, Yanxi class has been mainly carrying out drone launch and recovery trials to support the development of naval UAVs.

References

Auxiliary ships of the People's Liberation Army Navy